Marion Gilchrist may refer to:

 Marion Gilchrist, British woman murdered in 1908, the case becoming a miscarriage of justice
 Marion Gilchrist (doctor) (1864–1952), Scottish doctor and  women's suffrage activist